Jean-Adrien Guignet (1816 – 1854) was a French orientalist painter.

Guignet was born in Annecy and grew up in the city of Autun. He was a friend of Hippolyte Michaud. He was a rather popular orientalist painter in his time, and was especially commanded for his Egyptian scenes. He died in Paris.

Works
Musée des beaux-arts de Beaune
 Soldat gaulois (circa 1854)
 Agar et Ismaël

Musée du Louvre
 Cambise et Psamménite
 Épisode de la retraite des Dix-Mille (circa 1842)

Musée des beaux-arts de Rouen
 Joseph expliquant les rêves du pharaon

 Musée Rolin
 Xerxes à l'Hellespont
 Autoportrait ("Self-portrait")

References

1816 births
1854 deaths
Orientalist painters
19th-century French painters
People from Annecy
People from Autun